In differential equations, the Laplace invariant of any of certain differential operators is a certain function of the coefficients and their derivatives.  Consider a bivariate hyperbolic differential operator of the second order

whose coefficients

are smooth functions of two variables.  Its Laplace invariants  have the form

Their importance is due to the classical theorem:

Theorem:  Two operators of the form are equivalent under gauge transformations if and only if their Laplace invariants coincide pairwise.

Here the operators
 

are called equivalent if there is a gauge transformation that takes one to the other:

Laplace invariants can be regarded as factorization "remainders" for the initial operator A:

If at least one of Laplace invariants is not equal to zero, i.e.

then this representation is a first step of the Laplace–Darboux transformations used for solving
non-factorizable bivariate linear partial differential equations (LPDEs).

If both Laplace invariants are equal to zero, i.e.

then the differential operator A is factorizable and corresponding linear partial differential equation of second order is solvable.

Laplace invariants have been introduced for a bivariate linear partial differential operator (LPDO) of order 2 and of hyperbolic type. They are a particular case of generalized invariants which can be constructed for a bivariate LPDO of arbitrary order and arbitrary type; see Invariant factorization of LPDOs.

See also
 Partial derivative
 Invariant (mathematics)
 Invariant theory

References
 G. Darboux, "Leçons sur la théorie général des surfaces", Gauthier-Villars  (1912)  (Edition: Second)
 G. Tzitzeica G., "Sur un theoreme de M. Darboux". Comptes Rendu de l'Academie des Sciences 150 (1910), pp. 955–956; 971–974
 L. Bianchi, "Lezioni di geometria differenziale", Zanichelli, Bologna, (1924)
 A. B. Shabat, "On the theory of Laplace–Darboux transformations". J. Theor. Math. Phys. Vol. 103, N.1,pp. 170–175 (1995) 
 A.N. Leznov, M.P. Saveliev. "Group-theoretical methods for integration on non-linear dynamical systems" (Russian), Moscow, Nauka (1985). English translation: Progress in Physics, 15. Birkhauser Verlag, Basel (1992)

Multivariable calculus
Differential operators